Horabagrus brachysoma or the sun catfish is a species of catfish endemic to rivers in the Western Ghats of India.  It is known as Günther's catfish or yellow catfish. It is also known as Manjakoori in its native range. It is also known by a host of other names, such as bullseye catfish, golden red tail catfish and solar catfish.

Description
H. brachysoma has a large head and a wide mouth. The eyes are large and can be seen from below the fish. There is a dorsal fin with a hard spine as well as an adipose fin. There are four pairs of barbels, one nasal, one maxillary (sides of the mouth), and two mandibular (chin). The body is yellowish with black shoulder spot surrounded by a lighter outline.  This fish can reach a length of  TL.

Distribution
H. brachysoma is known from the Kerala Backwaters, Vembanad Lake, Chalakudy River, Nethravathi River of south Karnataka. and the Uttara Kannada district of India.  They occur in smooth flowing areas with much vegetation.

Habitat and ecology
H. brachysoma is found in smooth flowing areas with much vegetation. Periyar river in Kerala state is the best habitat but now they are commonly seen in the Chalakudy River due to the less disturbed habitats. The population genetic structure of this species has been studied extensively by using genetic markers.  This species occupies lowland areas of rivers and backwaters with mud or sand substrate. It has also been recorded in deep pools and hill streams.
The diet of H. brachysoma has been studied. It is an unspecialized feeder and eats a variety of meaty foods. Food items include crustaceans, molluscs, and fish. Adults may consume terrestrial insects and even frogs. Stomachs of these fish contain detritus which is indicative of its bottom-feeding habits. This flexible diet is beneficial in its variable habitat, in which food availality is affected by monsoons.  Feeding rate is known to increase during the breeding season in the months following the monsoon season. Spawning occurs before the monsoons and finishes by the southwest monsoon in the summer.

Relationships with humans
H. brachysoma is an important food fish in India and is also sold in the aquarium trade. The IUCN considers H. brachysoma to be a vulnerable species, while other have considered it to be an endangered species.  Overexploitation, habitat alteration, pollution and related anthropogenic pressures on their natural habitats have considerably reduced populations of this species by 60–70% during the last few years.

References

Horabagridae
Catfish of Asia
Endemic fauna of India
Freshwater fish of India
Fauna of the Western Ghats
Vulnerable fish
Vulnerable fauna of Asia
Taxa named by Albert Günther
Fish described in 1864